In mathematics, particularly in functional analysis, a webbed space is a topological vector space designed with the goal of allowing the results of the open mapping theorem and the closed graph theorem to hold for a wider class of linear maps whose codomains are webbed spaces. A space is called webbed if there exists a collection of sets, called a web that satisfies certain properties. Webs were first investigated by de Wilde.

Web

Let  be a Hausdorff locally convex topological vector space. A  is a stratified collection of disks satisfying the following absorbency and convergence requirements. 
 Stratum 1: The first stratum must consist of a sequence  of disks in  such that their union  absorbs  
 Stratum 2: For each disk  in the first stratum, there must exists a sequence  of disks in  such that for every :  and  absorbs  The sets  will form the second stratum. 
 Stratum 3: To each disk  in the second stratum, assign another sequence  of disks in  satisfying analogously defined properties; explicitly, this means that for every :  and  absorbs  The sets  form the third stratum. 

Continue this process to define strata  That is, use induction to define stratum  in terms of stratum  

We also require that if a sequence of vectors  is selected from a strand (with  belonging to the first disk in the strand,  belonging to the second, and so on) then the series  converges.

Examples and sufficient conditions

All of the following spaces are webbed:
 Fréchet spaces. 
 Projective limits and inductive limits of sequences of webbed spaces.
 A sequentially closed vector subspace of a webbed space.
 Countable products of webbed spaces.
 A Hausdorff quotient of a webbed space.
 The image of a webbed space under a sequentially continuous linear map if that image is Hausdorff.
 The bornologification of a webbed space.
 The continuous dual space of a metrizable locally convex space endowed with the strong dual topology is webbed. 
 So in particular, the strong duals of locally convex metrizable spaces are webbed.
 If  is a webbed space, then any Hausdorff locally convex topology weaker than this (webbed) topology is also webbed.

Theorems

If the spaces are not locally convex, then there is a notion of web where the requirement of being a disk is replaced by the requirement of being balanced. For such a notion of web we have the following results:

See also

Citations

References

 
  
  
  
  
  

Functional analysis
Topological vector spaces